John Bowden may refer to:

John Bowden (architect) (died 1822), Irish architect
John William Bowden (1798–1844), English functionary and writer on church matters
John Bowden (minister) (died 1750), English Presbyterian minister
John Bowden (cricketer) (born 1973), English cricketer
John Bowden (linguist) (born 1958), Australian linguist
John Bowden (theologian) (1935–2010), English theologian and publisher
John Bowden (banker), Governor of the Bank of England, 1822–1824